Újezdec is a municipality and village in Mělník District in the Central Bohemian Region of the Czech Republic. It has about 100 inhabitants.

History
The first written mention of Újezdec is from 1380.

References

Villages in Mělník District